Public Life with Randy David is a Philippine television public affairs show broadcast by GMA Network. Hosted by Randy David, it premiered on November 28, 1996. The show concluded in 1998. It was replaced by Compañero y Compañera in its timeslot.

Overview

The show first aired on November 28, 1996 in GMA Network. It tackles issues of government and related policies in the Philippines, and on its economic issues like business and other non-government organization. The show was last aired in 1998.

References

1996 Philippine television series debuts
1998 Philippine television series endings
English-language television shows
GMA Network original programming
GMA Integrated News and Public Affairs shows
Philippine television shows